The  is a term for regular flights by Soviet (and later Russian) military aircraft past Japan. They sometimes involve violations of Japanese airspace and have often been intercepted by fighter aircraft of the Japan Air Self-Defense Force.

During the Cold War the flights tended to take place along the Sea of Japan side of the country. During the Cold War Tupolev Tu-16, Tupolev Tu-95 and Myasishchev M-4 aircraft were used. Some of them were transiting to or from Cam Ranh Base in southern Vietnam. The Soviet Union started using the base in 1979.

After the Cold War ended Russia dramatically reduced its flights and stopped using Cam Ranh base. However, from 2007 Russia re-started regular flights, which now often take place on the Pacific Ocean side of Japan. In this second iteration, Tupolev Tu-22M, Tupolev Tu-95 and Tupolev Tu-142 aircraft are used. As of 2015 Russian aircraft have begun using Cam Ranh Base again, including for Il-78 tankers to support bomber flights in the Pacific.

See also
 Violations of Japanese airspace

References

Cold War
Russian Air Force
Soviet Air Force
Russian Naval Aviation
Naval Aviation
Aviation in the Soviet Union
Aviation accidents and incidents in Japan
Japan–Soviet Union relations